Filariomyces is a genus of fungi in the family Laboulbeniaceae. A monotypic genus, Filariomyces contains the single species Filariomyces forficulae.

References

External links
Filariomyces at Index Fungorum

Laboulbeniaceae
Monotypic Laboulbeniomycetes genera
Laboulbeniales genera